Rnd1 is a small (~21 kDa) signaling G protein (to be specific, a GTPase), and is a member of the Rnd subgroup of the Rho family of GTPases. It is encoded by the gene RND1.

It contributes to regulating the organization of the actin cytoskeleton in response to extracellular growth factors (Nobes et al., 1998).[supplied by OMIM]

Interactions 

Rnd1 has been shown to interact with GRB7, PLXNB1, PDE6D, ARHGAP5 and UBXD5.

References

Further reading